Belize competed at the 1976 Summer Olympics in Montreal, Quebec, Canada.  Previously, the nation had competed as British Honduras. Four competitors, all men, took part in four events in two sports.

Athletics

Men
Track & road events

Shooting

Two male shooters represented British Honduras in 1976.

Open

References

Official Olympic Reports

Nations at the 1976 Summer Olympics
1976
Oly